TRNA-dihydrouridine16/17 synthase (NAD(P)+) (Dus1p, tRNA-dihydrouridine synthase 1) is an enzyme with systematic name tRNA-5,6-dihydrouracil16/17:NAD(P)+ oxidoreductase. This enzyme catalyses the following chemical reaction

 (1) 5,6-dihydrouracil16 in tRNA + NAD(P)+  uracil16 in tRNA + NAD(P)H + H+
 (2) 5,6-dihydrouracil17 in tRNA + NAD(P)+  uracil17 in tRNA + NAD(P)H + H+

This enzyme specifically modifies uracil16 and uracil17 in tRNA.

References

External links 
 

EC 1.3.1